Cecil Edward Kinahan (April 15, 1879 – March 15, 1912) was an Irish track and field athlete who competed in the 1908 Summer Olympics for the United Kingdom of Great Britain and Ireland.

Kinahan was born in Norwood, Greater London to Irish parents. He represented Ireland internationally. In 1908 he was eliminated in the semi-finals of the 110 metre hurdles event after finished second in his heat.

He was commissioned a second lieutenant in the Princess Victoria's (Royal Irish Fusiliers) on 20 May 1899, and left with the 1st battalion of his regiment for South Africa after the outbreak of the Second Boer War in 1899. He took part in operations in Natal Colony, including the battles of Talana Hill and Lombard's Kop (October 1899), and was promoted to a lieutenant on 24 February 1900. From June that year he served in the Transvaal, east of Pretoria. In October and November 1900 he served in the Orange River Colony. Following the end of the war in June 1902, he returned home with other men of his battalion on the SS Pinemore, arriving at Southampton in October that year.

Kinahan died in Sudan, as part of the Egyptian army fighting the Annaks.

References

External links
profile

1870s births
1974 deaths
Irish male hurdlers
British male hurdlers
Olympic athletes of Great Britain
Athletes (track and field) at the 1908 Summer Olympics
Athletes from London